Pseudacraea warburgi, the incipient false acraea, is a butterfly in the family Nymphalidae. It is found in Senegal, Guinea, Sierra Leone, Liberia, Ivory Coast, Ghana, Nigeria, Cameroon, the Republic of the Congo, the Democratic Republic of the Congo and Uganda (from the western part of the country to the Bwamba Valley).

Description
Very similar to Pseudacraea hostilia q.v. for differences.

Biology
The habitat consists of forest.

It is a mimic of an Acraea species.

The larvae feed on Strephanema, Manilkara and Combretum species.

References

Butterflies described in 1892
Limenitidinae
Butterflies of Africa